The 1990 NCAA men's volleyball tournament was the 21st annual tournament to determine the national champion of NCAA men's collegiate volleyball. The tournament was played at the Patriot Center in Fairfax, Virginia during May 1990.

USC defeated Long Beach State in the final match, 3–1 (15–10, 12–15, 15–4, 15–6), to win their fourth national title. The Trojans (26–7) were coached by Jim McLaughlin.

USC's Bryan Ivie was named the tournament's Most Outstanding Player. Ivie, along with five other players, comprised the All-Tournament Team.

Qualification
Until the creation of the NCAA Men's Division III Volleyball Championship in 2012, there was only a single national championship for men's volleyball. As such, all NCAA men's volleyball programs, whether from Division I, Division II, or Division III, were eligible. A total of 4 teams were invited to contest this championship.

Tournament bracket 
Site: Patriot Center, Fairfax, Virginia

All tournament team 
Bryan Ivie, USC (Most outstanding player)
Dan Greenbaum, USC
Jason Perkins, USC
Kevin Shepard, USC
Brent Hilliard, Long Beach State
Mark Kerins, Long Beach State

See also 
 NCAA Men's National Collegiate Volleyball Championship
 NCAA Women's Volleyball Championships (Division I, Division II, Division III)

References

1990
NCAA Men's Volleyball Championship
NCAA Men's Volleyball Championship
1990 in sports in Virginia
Volleyball in Virginia